The World University Softball Championship is an under-28 softball tournament for women's national teams held by the International Softball Federation (ISF).

Softball Championshipss were held in 2004 and 2006, in 2007 it was an optional sport at the Summer Universiade. 2012 was to be the third rendition of the World University Softball Championship in Colorado Springs, Colorado, but was canceled due to a lack of entries. In 2020, the softball championship will be held together with men’s baseball championship.

Results

Medal table

As a Summer Universiade sport

References

External links
Softball fisu.net

International softball competitions
Softball